The 1989 Arkansas State Indians football team represented Arkansas State University as an independent during the 1989 NCAA Division I-AA football season. Led by 11th-year head coach Larry Lacewell, the Indians finished the season with a record of 5–6.

Schedule

References

Arkansas State
Arkansas State Red Wolves football seasons
Arkansas State Indians football